is a Japanese athlete. He competed in the men's javelin throw at the 1964 Summer Olympics.

References

1938 births
Living people
Athletes (track and field) at the 1964 Summer Olympics
Japanese male javelin throwers
Olympic athletes of Japan
Place of birth missing (living people)
Asian Games medalists in athletics (track and field)
Asian Games bronze medalists for Japan
Athletes (track and field) at the 1962 Asian Games
Medalists at the 1962 Asian Games
20th-century Japanese people